Pradamano is a town and comune in  Friuli-Venezia Giulia, north-eastern Italy.

Twin towns
Pradamano is twinned with:

  Bad Bleiberg, Austria

References

Cities and towns in Friuli-Venezia Giulia